The Dorset Martyrs Memorial is a grade II listed sculpture by Elisabeth Frink in Dorchester, Dorset, England. It was unveiled in 1986 on the site of the gallows where Catholic martyrs were hanged in the 16th and 17th centuries.

References

External links 

Dorchester, Dorset
Outdoor sculptures in England
Monuments and memorials in Dorset
Grade II listed monuments and memorials
Catholic Church in England and Wales
Grade II listed buildings in Dorset
1986 sculptures
Sculptures by Elisabeth Frink